Soft tennis was a discipline of the tennis competitions at the 1994 Asian Games. Competition took place from October 10 to October 14. All events were held at the Central Tennis Stadium in Hiroshima, Japan.

South Korea topped the medal table winning two gold medals.

Medalists

Medal table

References 
 New Straits Times, October 10–15, 1994
Results
Results
Results

External links 
 Olympic Council of Asia

1994 Asian Games events
1994
Asian Games
1994 Asian Games